Yan, also known as the Great Yan, was a dynastic state of China established in 756 by the former Tang general An Lushan, after he rebelled against Emperor Xuanzong of Tang in 755. The state collapsed in 763 with the death of An Lushan's former subordinate Shi Chaoyi (son of Shi Siming), who was the last person to claim the title as emperor of Yan.

Rulers of Yan

References

Sources
 
 
 
 
 

Former countries in Chinese history
States and territories established in the 750s
756 establishments
763 disestablishments

8th-century establishments in China